Leo I of Galicia (c. 1228 – c. 1301) was a king of Ruthenia, prince (Kniaz) of Belz (1245–1264), Peremyshl, Halych (1264–1269), and  grand prince of Kiev (Kyiv, 1271–1301).

He was a son of King Daniel of Galicia and his first wife, Anna Mstislavna Smolenskaia (daughter of Mstislav Mstislavich the Bold). As his father, Lev was a member of the senior branch of Vladimir II Monomakh descendants.

Reign
Leo (also known as Lev) moved his father's capital from Halych to the newly founded city of Lviv. This city was named after him by its founder, Lev's father, King Daniel of Galicia. In 1247, Leo married Constance, the daughter of Béla IV of Hungary. Unlike his father, who pursued a western political course, Leo worked closely with the Mongols and together with them invaded Poland. However, although his troops plundered territory as far west as Racibórz in Silesia, sending many captives and much booty back to Galicia, Leo did not ultimately gain much territory from Poland. He cultivated a particularly close alliance with the Tatar Nogai Khan. He also attempted, unsuccessfully, to establish his family's rule over Lithuania. Soon after his younger brother Shvarn ascended to the Lithuanian throne in 1267, Leo organized the murder of Grand Duke of Lithuania Vaišvilkas. Following Shvarn's loss of the throne in 1269, Leo entered into conflict with Lithuania. In 1274–1276, he fought a war with the new Lithuanian ruler —Traidenis — but was defeated. Lithuania annexed the territory of Black Ruthenia with its city of Navahrudak.

In 1279, Leo allied himself with King Wenceslaus II of Bohemia and invaded Poland. His attempt to capture Kraków in 1280 ended in failure. That same year, however, Leo defeated the Kingdom of Hungary and temporarily annexed part of Carpathian Ruthenia, including the town of Mukachevo. In 1292, he defeated Poland and added Lublin with surrounding areas to the territory of Halych–Volhynia. At the time of Leo's death in 1301, the state of Galicia-Volhynia was at the height of its power.

Marriage and children
Lev I married Constance of Hungary, daughter of Béla IV of Hungary and Maria Laskarina. They had three children:

Yuri I of Halych–Volhynia (24 April 1252/1257 – 18 March 1308).
Svyatoslava Lvovna of Halych–Volhynia (died 1302), a nun
Anastasia Lvovna of Halych–Volhynia (died 12 March 1335), who married Siemowit of Dobrzyń.

See also
 List of rulers of Galicia and Volhynia
 List of Ukrainian rulers

External links

Lev Danylovych at the Encyclopedia of Ukraine, vol. 3 (1993).

1220s births
1300s deaths
Year of birth uncertain
Year of death uncertain

Kings of Rus'
Grand Princes of Kiev
Romanovichi family
Rostislavichi family (Smolensk)
13th-century princes in Kievan Rus'
Eastern Orthodox monarchs